Fiona Coyne may refer to:

Fiona Coyne (Degrassi), a fictional character from Degrassi: The Next Generation
Fiona Coyne (presenter) (1965–2010), host of the South African version of The Weakest Link
 "Fiona Coyne", a single  from Skylar Spence’s 2015 album Prom King, named after the Degrassi character